Do Dishayen  is a 1982 Bollywood romantic drama film starring Dharmendra, Hema Malini and Prem Chopra directed by Dulal Guha.

Plot

Ajitesh is a wealthy businessman, whose wife Maya leaves him after the birth of their kid named Arunesh. When Arun craves for his mother's love, Ajit mages to calm him down by lying about the whereabouts of his mother. One fine day, Arun walks into a store and finds Uma, who looks exactly like his mother. He convinces her to come to his house but before he could introduce her to his father, she goes away.

Cast

 Dharmendra as Ajitesh
 Hema Malini as Maya / Uma (Double Role)
 Shreeram Lagoo as Bhupesh
 Nirupa Roy as Neeru
 Prem Chopra as Jagan
 Aruna Irani as Reena
 Satyendra Kapoor as Dr. Vinay
 Baby Pinky as Arunesh, Ajitesh's son 
 Asit Sen as Hariya
 Nargis Rabadi as Mrs. Rustamjee
 Manik Dutt as Maya's Uncle
 Dulari as Maya's Aunty
 Rajan Haskar as Nivaran Sharma
 Asha Sharma as Mrs. Nivaran Sharma
 Sudhir Pandey as Swamiji

Music
All songs are music by Laxmikant–Pyarelal and written by Anand Bakshi.

External links
 

1982 films
1980s Hindi-language films
Films scored by Laxmikant–Pyarelal